Captain William Norman Lascelles Davidson (c.1871 – 31 January 1935) was an English soldier who was an early experimenter in color cinematography.

Davidson was born in Notting Hill, London to Col. Alfred Augustus Davidson of the British Indian Army. He himself because Captain of the 4th Battalion of the Kings Liverpool Regiment.

Between 1898 and 1906, Davidson spent around £3,000 trying to create a workable natural-color motion picture system. Although his work was unsuccessful, he influenced George Albert Smith who developed the color process, known as Kinemacolor.

References

English cinematographers
1870s births
1935 deaths
Year of birth uncertain